Waldburg-Wolfegg-Zeil was a County ruled by the House of Waldburg, located in southeastern Baden-Württemberg, Germany. Waldburg-Wolfegg-Zeil was a partition of Waldburg and was repartitioned in 1589, to create Waldburg-Waldburg, Waldburg-Wolfegg and Waldburg-Zeil.

States and territories established in 1424
1589 disestablishments